Enneapterygius nigricauda, known commonly as the blacktail triplefin or the Pacific blacktail triplefin, is a species of triplefin blenny in the genus Enneapterygius. It was described by Ronald Fricke in 1997. It is found in the western Pacific Ocean from the Bonin Islands to Wake Island.

References

nigricauda
Fish described in 1997